Index Peak, el. , is a prominent mountain peak in the Absaroka Range in Park County, Wyoming.  The peak is visible from US Route 212, the Beartooth Highway just east of the Northeast Entrance Station to Yellowstone National Park.  Pilot Peak rises just south of Index Peak.

Notes

Mountains of Wyoming